St. Raphael's Higher Secondary School is a Catholic all-girls' convent school founded by Fr. Raphael, OFM Cap in 1928 in Indore, Madhya Pradesh, India.

Located at 15 Old Sehore Road, it is administered by the Sisters of the Holy Spirit (SSpS). The school received CBSE affiliation in the year 1996–1997. Classes start from Pre-nursery to 12th in CBSE board. .

References

External links
Official website

Schools in Indore
Girls' schools in Madhya Pradesh
1928 establishments in India
Educational institutions established in 1928
Catholic schools in India